Shaved and Dangerous is the second studio album by Australian band the Baby Animals, released in August 1993.

Track listing 
All tracks written by Suze DeMarchi, Dave Leslie and Eddie Parise unless otherwise noted.

 "Backbone" - 5:18
 "Stoopid" (Suze DeMarchi, Eddie Parise) - 2:48
 "Don't Tell Me What to Do" - 4:11
 "Lights Out at Eleven" - 5:29
 "At the End of the Day" (Suze DeMarchi, Eddie Parise) - 2:50
 "Lovin' Lies" (Suze DeMarchi, Steve Elson, Frank Celenza, Dave Leslie, Eddie Parise) - 3:32
 "Bupata" - 3:58
 "Nervous at Night" - 4:00
 "Because I Can" (Nuno Bettencourt, Suze DeMarchi) - 3:38
 "Life From a Distance" - 4:26
 "Be My Friend" (Andy Fraser, Paul Rodgers) - 4:04

Charts and certifications

Weekly charts

Certifications

Personnel
 Dave Leslie - Guitar, Vocals 
 Frank Celenza - Drums 
 Suze DeMarchi - Vocals, Guitar
 Eddie Parise - Bass, Vocals
 Nuno Bettencourt - Guitar (Acoustic), Guitar, Vocals  
 John DeChristopher - Strings, Cymbals, Stick 
 Tony Italia - Drums 
 Bill O'Meara - Strings, Cymbals, Stick

Credits
 Michael Halsband - Photography 
 Paul Hamingson - Engineer
 Gail Marowitz - Art Direction, Design
 Carl Nappa - Assistant Engineer 
 Richard Parsons - Engineer, Assistant Engineer
 Bob St. John - Engineer 
 Ed Stasium - Producer, Engineer, Mixing 
 Nuno Bettencourt - Producer

References

1993 albums
Baby Animals albums
albums produced by Ed Stasium